Leo Charles Schultz  (17 October 1914 – 9 June 1996) was a New Zealand farmer and a politician of the National Party.

Biography

Schultz was born in 1914 in Hāwera. He received his education at Ngatea District High School, and afterwards became a dairy and sheep farmer. In 1940, he married Evelyn Anne Bridgeman, the daughter of E. Bridgeman. They had two sons and two daughters.

He joined the National Party in 1938 and was chairman of the executive in the Hauraki electorate (1958–1969). He served on local government for 23 years before his parliamentary career.

In the 1994 Queen's Birthday Honours, Schultz was awarded the Queen's Service Medal for public services.

References

|-

|-

|-

1914 births
1996 deaths
New Zealand National Party MPs
People from Hāwera
New Zealand MPs for North Island electorates
Recipients of the Queen's Service Medal
Members of the New Zealand House of Representatives
20th-century New Zealand politicians
New Zealand justices of the peace